Sri Anjaneyar Kovil is a Hindu temple situated in Mount Lavinia, in Colombo, Sri Lanka. It is dedicated to God Hanuman, one of the central characters of the Hindu epic Ramayana. Established on 30 June 1996, the temple is considered to be the only Hindu shrine in the country where a statue of Hanuman with Panchamuga (five faced) is found. It is also said to be the only temple in the world to have a chariot for Anjaneyar.

See also 
Hinduism in Sri Lanka

References

External links
Panchamuga Anjaneyar Temple Colombo

Hindu temples in Western Province, Sri Lanka